Portraits is the seventh album by R&B group Side Effect. Released in 1981, this was their second album for Elektra Records.

Track listing
I Can't Play (Miki Howard) 	3:33 	
Do It 	4:16 	
Make You Mine 	4:14 	
I Need Your Lovin' 	3:52 	
Midnight Lover (Miki Howard)  	4:46 	
It's Got To Be Love 	3:54 	
Reggae Dancin' 	4:58 	
If You Believe 	2:47 	
The Loneliest Man In Town 	4:05 	
The Lord's Prayer 	1:51

Charts

Singles

References

External links
 Side Effect-Portraits at Discogs

1981 albums
Elektra Records albums
Side Effect albums
Albums recorded at Total Experience Recording Studios